Simon McBride (born 9 April 1979) is a Northern Irish singer and guitarist, who has played with other artists, including Deep Purple and Snakecharmer, as well as recording and touring his own band, and teaching at BIMM in Dublin. 

He was announced as Deep Purple’s permanent replacement for Steve Morse on 16 September 2022 after covering for him in concerts earlier in the year.

Career 
McBride started playing the guitar when he was nine. "I was born myself into a house of rock n roll and was influenced by the music my Dad listened to as I was growing up in Belfast, he was and still is a fan of classic rock bands like Led Zeppelin, Deep Purple, Free etc, which was always on the hi fi. ... I was about nine years old when I just picked it up one day and sat down with a tuition book and started to learn a few chords".. By age 15 he entered Guitarist magazine's Young Guitarist of the Year, a performance competition staged that year at Wembley Conference Centre, which he won.

Less than a year later, a few months after his sixteenth birthday, McBride was recruited by the Belfast-based metal band Sweet Savage, which reformed in 1994 without their founding guitarist, Vivian Campbell, (who had gone on to be a member of Dio, Def Leppard and Whitesnake), who McBride replaced.  He toured with the band and recorded two albums, Killing Time 1996 and Rune 1998.

After leaving Sweet Savage in 1998, he joined fellow Irishman Andrew Strong, who made his name in the 1991 cult film The Commitments and went on to establish a singing career. Playing with Strong was in stark contrast to Sweet Savage, involving mostly of soul, R&B and some pop songs. The change of musical style was a useful learning experience and closer in style to the rock and blues artists that had inspired McBride to start playing the guitar. He spent six years touring with Strong before leaving to pursue the idea of a solo career.

In 2008, McBride released his debut album, Rich Man Falling on Nugene Records, a boutique label with a specialisation in guitarists and blues-based artists. The album contains covers of Be My Friend originally by Free and the Jimi Hendrix song "Power of Soul".

By this time, he had opened shows in the UK and Ireland for Jeff Beck, Joe Bonamassa and US slide guitarist Derek Trucks. In autumn 2010, he toured the UK supporting one of his early guitar heroes, Joe Satriani. In 2011, he played major festivals including Glastonbury Festival, and other gatherings including a special guest spot at Don Airey's Soul & Blues Festival in 2011 and 2013.

During a tour of the UK in 2011, each show was recorded. This resulted in McBride's third CD release Nine Lives (Nugene Records), so called because there are nine in-concert tracks. The album also contains four solo acoustic tracks, one of which is an acoustic rendition of the title track of his 2008 release Rich Man Falling.

In 2012, he released "Crossing The Line" (Nugene Records) an album of mostly original work plus the Blood, Sweat & Tears song "Go Down Gamblin'". The album was recorded in Belfast, Northern Ireland, and Maryland, US, and mixed in New York by veteran producer/engineer Peter Denenberg. This album made several "best of" annual charts including that of Classic Rock magazine.

In 2016, McBride joined the classic rock band "Snakecharmer", which was formed of former Whitesnake members, replacing Micky Moody and recorded their new album "Second Skin" released in May 2017 touring with them ever since.

In 2022, he was announced as the temporary replacement for Steve Morse in Deep Purple, while Steve cared for his wife during her battle with cancer. Before he joined he had worked with Deep Purple keyboardist, Don Airey, on his solo tours as a member of "The Don Airey Band" or "Don Airey & Friends". On 23 July 2022 It was announced that Steve Morse had permanently left the band and saying that, "I'm now handing over the keys to the vault which holds the secret of how Ritchie (Blackmore)'s Smoke on the Water intro was recorded," and that McBride had the gig "nailed". 

McBride was formally announced by Deep Purple as the permanent replacement for Morse on 16 September 2022. He thereby became the fourth permanent guitarist in the band over its 54-year history, after Ritchie Blackmore, Tommy Bolin and Steve Morse.

Endorsements and teaching 
As a teenage guitarist McBride caught the ear of the world's leading independent guitar builder Paul Reed Smith, and to this day McBride is a PRS Guitars-endorsed artist, a role that has taken him to music events around Europe and to The PRS Experience, an event held annually at the PRS Guitars factory in Maryland, US, where McBride has played alongside such names as Santana and Buddy Guy. He also endorses Victory amplifiers and Rotosound Strings.

He is a visiting tutor at the Dublin school of BIMM (Brighton Institute of Modern Music) and has also been a guest tutor at the International Guitar Foundation summer school and at BIMM in Bristol.

Selected discography

Solo releases

As band/session member

References

External links 

 Official website

1979 births
Living people
Guitarists from Northern Ireland
Blues rock musicians
21st-century guitarists
Deep Purple members